Pandanus temehaniensis is a species of plant in the family Pandanaceae. It is endemic to French Polynesia.

References

Flora of French Polynesia
temehaniensis
Least concern plants
Taxonomy articles created by Polbot